Lüshun Port in Lüshunkou District, Dalian, Liaoning province, China, refers to the original Lüshun Naval Port for military use or the New Lüshun Port for commercial use. The port was known in colonial times as Port Arthur.

Lüshun Naval Base
Lüshun Naval Base was established during the 1880s for Qing dynasty's Beiyang Fleet, together with the headquarters at Weihaiwei. It is located to the south of the central part of Lüshun, in the bay of Lüshun.

The management of Lüshun Naval Base changed hands from China, to imperial Russia 1895-1904, to imperial Japan 1905–1945, to the Soviet Union 1945–56, and then back to China after 1956.

Nearby is Lüshun Railway Station of the Lüshun Branch Line (Chinese: 旅顺支线) of Chinese Eastern Railway.

New Lüshun Port

New Lüshun Port was established from the late 20th century to the early 21st century as Lüshun's economy started to thrive. It is located to the west of central Lüshun, and to the east of Bay of Yangtouwa. There is Lüshun West Station of the freight railway line from the Lüshun Branch Line, for the Bohai Train Ferry.

New Lüshun Port Station of the extension of Dalian's 202 railway is located nearby.

See also
 Dalian Port

References

External links
 New Lüshun Port Management Co.

Ports and harbours of China
Dalian
Bohai Sea
Installations of the Russian Navy
Installations of the Soviet Navy
China–Soviet Union relations
Military installations of the Soviet Union in other countries